Live at Woodstock is a posthumous live album by Jimi Hendrix released on July 6, 1999. It documents most of his performance at the Woodstock Festival on August 18, 1969, and contains Hendrix's iconic interpretation of "The Star-Spangled Banner" and other songs from the original festival film and soundtrack album.

Overview
Woodstock was Hendrix's first public performance since the breakup of the Jimi Hendrix Experience on June 29, 1969. At Woodstock, he was accompanied by an expanded lineup of 
backing musicians. The short-lived group has been informally referred to as "Gypsy Sun and Rainbows", after a comment Hendrix made during the performance:

Hendrix's historic set began at 9 a.m. and lasted for about two hours; he played to a dwindling Monday morning audience and the set closed the festival.

Releases and omissions
The album, produced by the family-run Experience Hendrix, supersedes the 1994 Woodstock album produced by Alan Douglas, which contains fewer and more edited tracks.  As with the earlier release, rhythm guitarist Larry Lee's medley of  "Gypsy Woman" with "Aware of Love" (both songs originally by the Impressions) and his "Mastermind" are not included. Lee's solo on "Red House" and Mitch Mitchell's drum solo on "Jam Back at the House" have been edited. A two-disc DVD version of  the performance was issued on September 13, 2005, and a single-disc Blu-ray version was issued on November 25, 2008.

Track listing
All songs were written by Jimi Hendrix, except where noted. Details are taken from the original Live at Woodstock MCA Records CD liner notes.  Other releases may show different information.

Personnel
Jimi Hendrixlead guitar, vocals
Mitch Mitchelldrums
Billy Coxbass guitar
Larry Leerhythm guitar
Juma Sultanpercussion
Jerry Velezpercussion

References

Albums produced by Eddie Kramer
Live albums published posthumously
Jimi Hendrix live albums
1999 live albums
MCA Records live albums
Woodstock Festival
The Star-Spangled Banner